Guillem is a Catalan first name, equivalent to William in the English language, which occasionally can appear as a surname. Its origin and pronunciation are the same as its Occitan variant Guilhèm, with a different spelling.

People with the first name Guillem
Guillem I de Cerdanya ((1068–1095); anglicised William I of Cerdanya), Count of Cerdanya and Berga
Guillem Ademar (fl. 1190/1195–1217), troubadour
Guillem Agel i Barrière (1753-1832), publisher and printer from Roussillon
Guillem Agulló i Salvador (1975–1993), murdered Valencian member of Maulets
Guillem Augier Novella, 13th century French troubadour
Guillem Balagué, sports journalist
Guillem Bauzà (1984-), Majorcan football player
Guillem Bofill, Catalan architect of the Girona Cathedral
Guillem Colom Ferrà (1890–1979), Majorcan translator and poet
Guillem d'Areny-Plandolit (1822–1876), Andorran politician who led the New Reform

Guillem de Balaun (fl. bef. 1223), Castellan of Balazuc and troubadour
Guillem de Cabestany (1162–1212), Catalan troubadour
Guillem de Cervera, more commonly known as Cerverí de Girona (fl. 1259–1285), Catalan troubadour
Guillem d'Efak, Majorcan singer born in Equatorial Guinea
Guillem de Gellone (755 – 28 May (traditional) 812/4; Occitan spelling, Guilhèm de Gellone; anglicised William of Gellone) Second count of Toulouse, cousin of Charlemagne
Guillem de Masdovelles (1389–1438), Catalan soldier, courtesan, politician, and poet
Guillem de Ribes (born c.1140), nobleman (castellan) of Sant Pere de Ribes and troubadour
Guillem de Saint Leidier, 12th century troubadour
Guillem de Septimània (826 – 850; anglicised William of Septimania), Count of Barcelona and Toulouse
Guillem Figueira, Languedocian jongleur and troubadour from Toulouse active at the court of the Emperor Frederick II in the 1230s
Guillem Magret (fl. 1195–1210), troubadour
Guillem Rainol d'At (fl. 1209), Provençal troubadour
Guillem Ramon de Gironella, late 13th century troubadour
Guillem Timoner Obrador (1926-), Majorcan cyclist
Peire Guilhem de Luserna, 13th century troubadour
Peire Guillem de Tolosa, 13th century troubadour

People with the surname Guillem
Pere Guillem, Bishop of Lleida 1126-1134
Sylvie Guillem (1965-) French ballerina

Other forms
Guillemó or Guillemundus, Frankish Count of Rasez and Conflent, son of Berà

See also
Guilhèm, Occitan equivalent
Guilherme, Portuguese equivalent
Guillermo, Spanish equivalent
Guillaume (given name), French equivalent
Guglielmo, Italian equivalent
William (name), English equivalent
 

Catalan masculine given names